Phibes is a surname. Notable people with the surname include:

 A. V. Phibes, American illustrator
 Dr. Phibes (Anton Phibes), character portrayed by Vincent Price in the horror films The Abominable Dr. Phibes and Dr. Phibes Rises Again